Edmund Czesław Potrzebowski (16 June 1926 – 22 May 2012) was a Polish middle-distance runner. He competed in the 800 metres and the 1500 metres at the 1952 Summer Olympics.

References

1926 births
2012 deaths
Athletes (track and field) at the 1952 Summer Olympics
Polish male middle-distance runners
Olympic athletes of Poland
Sportspeople from Chorzów